Abatzi is a surname. Notable people with the surname include:

 Rita Abatzi (1914–1969), Greek rebetiko musician
 Areti Abatzi (born 1974), Greek discus thrower

See also
 Nick Abadzis (born 1965), British comic book writer and artist